Plovdiv Province (: Oblast Plovdiv, former name Plovdiv okrug) is a province in central southern Bulgaria. The province is named after its administrative and industrial centre — the city of Plovdiv.

Geography

Plovdiv Province includes parts of the Upper Thracian Plain, the Rhodopes, Sredna Gora, the Sub-Balkan valleys and Stara Planina, including its highest peak, Botev (2,376m). The main rivers in the province are Maritsa, Stryama, Pyasachnik. There are numerous dams, the most important of which is Pyasachnik. Mineral springs are abundant; there are several major spa resorts —  Hisarya, Narechen, Banya and minor spas at Klisura, Asenovgrad, Kuklen, Rosino, Krasnovo, Stoletovo and others. There are many natural landmarks, especially in the Central Balkan National Park, including the spectacular waterfall Raysko Praskalo, the highest in the Balkans.

Municipalities

Plovdiv Province (Област, oblast) contains 18 municipalities (singular: община, obshtina, plural: Общини, obshtini). The following table shows the names of each municipality in English and Cyrillic, the main town or village (towns are shown in bold), and the population of each as of December 2009.

Towns

The province's capital is the city of Plovdiv; other towns include Karlovo, Sopot, Klisura, Kalofer, Hisarya, Saedinenie, Rakovski, Brezovo, Stamboliyski, Krichim, Perushtitsa, Sadovo, Parvomay, Asenovgrad, Laki, Katunica, and Yiagodovo.

Demographics

The following table represents the change of the population in the province after World War II:

Ethnic groups

Total population (2011 census): 683 027
Ethnic groups (2011 census):
Identified themselves: 620 373 persons:
Bulgarians: 540 303 (87,09%)
Turks: 40 255 (6,49%)
Romani: 30 202 (4,87%)
Others and indefinable: 9 613 (1,54%)
A further 60,000 persons in Plovdiv Province did not declare their ethnic group at the 2011 census.

Ethnic groups according to the 2001 census, when 715 816 people of the population of 715,904 of Plovdiv Province identified themselves (with percentage of total population):
Bulgarians: 621 338 (86.8%)
Turks: 52 499 (7.3%)
Romani: 30 196 (4.2%)
Armenians: 3 140 (0.4%)
Russians: 1 151 (0.2%)
Greeks: 766 (0.1%)

Religion

Religious adherence in the province according to 2001 census:

Economy

The economy of the province is of great importance. The agricultural production is intensive and efficient with high levels of irrigation. The major crops are fruit (apples, plums, pears, cherries), grapes, melons and watermelons, vegetables (tomatoes, peppers, carrots, cabbage, potatoes), wheat, rice, barley and others. Industry is very well developed: ferrous metallurgy near Plovdiv; thriving electronics industry in Plovdiv, Saedinenie, Voivodinovo, Radinovo and other villages in the area; agricultural machinery (tractors) in Karlovo; weapon and military plants in Sopot, Karlovo, Plovdiv; chemical industry in Plovdiv, Asenovgrad; food industry is developed almost everywhere, most notably in Plovdiv and Asenovgrad (wines). Tourism is a growing industry with the rich cultural heritage of the province and the numerous mineral springs which are of international importance.

See also
List of villages in Plovdiv Province

References

 
Provinces of Bulgaria